Russell Stuart Cedric Clark (27 August 1905 – 29 July 1966) was a New Zealand artist, illustrator, sculptor and university lecturer. He was born in Christchurch, North Canterbury, New Zealand, on 27 August 1905. He attended Canterbury College School of Art from 1922 to 1928. He was an Official War Artist for New Zealand during the Second World War. Colin McCahon and Doris Lusk were among his students. Clark worked as an illustrator at the New Zealand School Journal both before and after the war, and was "the first unofficial art editor". By the 1950s, he was working for both the School Journal and the Listener. Many of Clark's art works are held in Archives New Zealand in Wellington.

The Russell Clark Award, established in 1975 for excellence in children's book illustration, was named in his honour. Since 2016, it has been awarded as part of the New Zealand Book Awards for Children and Young Adults.

References

1905 births
1966 deaths
New Zealand educators
People educated at Christchurch Boys' High School
Ilam School of Fine Arts alumni
Academic staff of the University of Canterbury
20th-century New Zealand sculptors
20th-century New Zealand male artists
Place of death missing